Brendan Kerry (born 18 November 1994) is an Australian figure skater. He is the 2017 CS Ondrej Nepela Trophy bronze medalist, the 2017 CS Lombardia Trophy bronze medalist, the 2019 Toruń Cup champion, the 2016 Egna Spring Trophy champion, and an eight-time Australian national champion (2011, 2013–2019).

Kerry has competed in the final segment at fifteen ISU Championships, achieving his highest placement, sixth, at the 2022 Four Continents. He placed 29th at the 2014 Winter Olympics, 20th at the 2018 Winter Olympics and 17th at the 2022 Winter Olympics.

Personal life 
Brendan Kerry was born 18 November 1994 in Sydney. His mother, Monica MacDonald, competed in ice dancing at the 1988 Winter Olympics, and his sister, Chantelle Kerry is also a figure skater. Abigail Kerry, a former ladies' singles competitor, now competes in ice dance.

Kerry attended Epping Boys High School before transferring to Sydney Distance Education High School to focus on skating.

Career

Early career 
Kerry started skating in 2004. He debuted on the ISU Junior Grand Prix (JGP) series in 2008. He won the Australian national junior title in the 2009–2010 season. In 2011, Kerry made his senior international debut at the Four Continents Championships. He also competed at his first World Junior Championships.

In the 2011–2012 season, Kerry won the Australian national title on the senior level and was assigned to his first World Championships. He was cut after finishing 15th in the preliminary round at the event in Nice, France.

2013–2014 season 
In September 2013, Kerry was sent to the Nebelhorn Trophy, the final qualifying competition for the 2014 Winter Olympics. As a result of his 8th-place finish, Australia received one of the six remaining spots for countries that had not previously qualified a men's entry. He placed 5th in both of his JGP events. In January, he reached the free skate at the 2014 Four Continents Championships in Taipei and went on to finish 20th overall. In February, Kerry placed 29th in the short program at the Olympics in Sochi, Russia, scoring 47.12 points. With only the top 24 advancing, it was not enough to progress to the final segment. He ended his season at the 2014 World Junior Championships, held in March in Sofia, Bulgaria. He placed 19th in the short, 20th in the free, and 21st overall.

2014–2015 season 
Kerry competed at two events of the newly inaugurated ISU Challenger Series, placing 9th at the 2014 CS Lombardia Trophy and 11th at the 2014 CS Skate Canada Autumn Classic. He finished 17th at the 2015 Four Continents Championships in Seoul, South Korea. At his second World Championships, he qualified to the free skate for the first time by placing 17th in the short program. He finished 20th overall in Shanghai, China.

2015–2016 season 
Kerry was invited to his first-ever Grand Prix event, the 2015 Skate America. He placed 11th in the short program, 7th in the free skate, and 8th overall. On 23 November, he was added to the 2015 NHK Trophy. He finished 12th in Japan and 19th at the 2016 Four Continents in Taipei, Taiwan. In March, he placed 17th at the 2016 World Championships in Boston after ranking 17th in both segments. Soon after, Kerry placed second in the short and first in the free to win the gold medal at Gardena Spring Trophy 2016, in Egna, Italy, setting two ISU personal bests (short program and total combined score).

2016–2017 season 
Kerry was invited to two Grand Prix events, the 2016 Skate America and 2016 Trophée de France, and finished tenth at both. In December, he won his fifth national title. In February 2017, he finished 11th at the 2017 Four Continents Championships in Gangneung, South Korea, and fifth at the Asian Winter Games in Sapporo, Japan.

In March, Kerry placed 13th in the short, 15th in the free, and 15th overall at the 2017 World Championships in Helsinki, Finland. Due to his result, Australia qualified a spot in the men's event at the 2018 Winter Olympics in Pyeongchang, South Korea.

2017–2018 season 
Kerry opened his season in mid-September, winning a bronze medal at the 2017 CS Lombardia Trophy and becoming the first Australian men's skater to finish on a Challenger Series podium. A week later, he received the bronze medal at the 2017 CS Ondrej Nepela Trophy.

After parting ways with long-time coach Tammy Gambill, Kerry confirmed his relocation to Moscow to train with Russian coach, Nikolai Morozov in mid-November.

Kerry was named to the Australian team for the 2018 Winter Olympics in November 2017 and won his fifth consecutive senior national title at the 2017 Australian National Championships in Brisbane in December.  He attended his second Winter Olympics, placing twentieth in the men's event.  He placed eighteenth at the 2018 World Championships.

2018–2019 season 
After withdrawing from the Autumn Classic, Kerry placed eleventh and tenth at his two Grand Prix assignments, the 2018 Skate Canada International and 2018 Rostelecom Cup.  Winning a sixth national title, he then placed ninth at the Four Continents Championships and twentieth at the World Championships.

2019–2020 season 
Kerry won his second consecutive Halloween Cup, and then began the Grand Prix at the 2019 Skate Canada International, where he placed twelfth of twelve skaters.  Kerry was seventh at the 2019 Cup of China.

Kerry placed twelfth at the 2020 Four Continents Championships. He was assigned to compete at the World Championships in Montreal, but these were cancelled as a result of the coronavirus pandemic.

2020–2021 season 
With the pandemic continuing to affect international travel, Kerry was assigned to compete at the 2020 Internationaux de France, but this event was also cancelled. He competed at French Masters as an invited international skater, winning the bronze. He was later named to the Australian team for the 2021 World Championships in Stockholm but withdrew due to a foot injury.

2021–2022 season 
Kerry returned to international competition at the 2021 CS Nebelhorn Trophy, where he placed seventh, securing a berth for Australia at the 2022 Winter Olympics. He fared less well at the 2021 CS Finlandia Trophy, his second Challenger event of the season, coming in thirteenth. Initially without a Grand Prix assignment, he was eventually named as a replacement for Maxim Naumov at the 2021 Rostelecom Cup, where he finished twelfth of twelve skaters. Kerry assessed his own performance as "terrible and very bad." He finished the fall season at the 2021 CS Golden Spin of Zagreb, where he was sixth.

Due to Australian federation rules with no national championships being held, Kerry was sent to the 2022 Four Continents Championships in Tallinn to compete with James Min and Jordan Dodds for the men's berth on the Australian Olympic team. Kerry finished in sixth at the event, over seventy points clear of Min, admitting afterwards that "it was really frustrating having to try to compete for the Olympic spot I earned again, a week and a half ahead of the Olympic Games." Shortly afterwards, he was named to the Olympic team.

Kerry was named Australia's co-flagbearer for the opening ceremonies at the 2022 Winter Olympics, alongside freestyle skier Laura Peel. Kerry placed seventeenth in the short program of the men's event. Sixteenth in the free skate, he finished seventeenth overall.

2022-2023 season

On July 22, Kerry was named to 2022 Skate America, but a few days later, Ice Skating Australia removed him from their assignments list, indicating he had withdrawn.

Programs

Competitive highlights 
GP: Grand Prix; CS: Challenger Series; JGP: Junior Grand Prix

References

External links 

 

Australian male single skaters
1994 births
Living people
Figure skaters from Sydney
Olympic figure skaters of Australia
Figure skaters at the 2014 Winter Olympics
Figure skaters at the 2018 Winter Olympics
People educated at Sydney Distance Education High School
Figure skaters at the 2017 Asian Winter Games
Figure skaters at the 2022 Winter Olympics